Agathiyar is a 1972 Indian Tamil-language Hindu mythological film written, directed, and produced by A. P. Nagarajan. The soundtrack was composed by Kunnakudi Vaidyanathan. The film stars Sirkazhi Govindarajan playing the main character, T. R. Mahalingam, A. V. M. Rajan, Kumari Padmini, R. S. Manohar, Suruli Rajan, Manorama and Sridevi were in supporting roles. This film ran for 100 days and won widespread appreciation. The film was dubbed into Hindi under the title Maharish in 1986.

Plot 
The story is about Agathiyar Muni, who is considered to be the embodiment of one of celestial intellectuals who descended on earth to enlighten human beings. During the wedding of Shiva and Goddess Parvati, the earth tilted to the northern side, as the whole world was witnessing the marriage. Shiva gave the responsibility of balancing the earth to Agathiyar by going to the southern side. Agathiyar is also given the additional responsibility of spreading goodness and equality. He has the additional task of spreading the Tamil language. Many small stories between heaven and earth are interwoven in the movie. The stories teach one to lead a simple existence without ego. It also shows how Agathiyar in this journey destroyed the ego of River Kaveri, Vindhya Mount and Ravana, thereby teaching them the greatness of humility.

Agathiyar travels southwards, while there, River Ponni talks to Agathiyar egotistically and argues with him. Finally, Agathiyar loses his temper and traps river Ponni in his Kamandalam, and sat down to meditate. Lord Vinayagar (Lord Ganesha) in the form of a crow, pushes Agathiyar Kamandalam down, thus rescuing and leading the river into its formation. Then Agathiyar named the River Ponni as River Kaveri (Crow) (In Tamil (Kakam), pushed Kamandalam and the water flows to broadly (In Tamil Virinthu Odiyathal) named as Ka + viri= Kaviri (became Kaveri in later usage).

One time Mount Vidhayan was continually growing in size due to taunting comments by Sage Narathar (Narada). So as to temper the vanity of the mountains, Sage Agathiyar travelled to the southern side via mount Vindhyan. On their way when Vindhyan saw Agathiyar, he bowed with respect and reverence, upon which sage Agathiyar jokingly asked if he would stay bowed and subdued with respect till the sage returned. Mount Vindhyan was truly benevolent and promised to not grow until the sage returns from the south. However, after passing through the mount, the sage will not require again to cross over to the northern side of Mount Vindhyan.

Narathar was speaking proudly to others. He is most reverent to Vishnu (Lord Narayana) because he always thinks and chants about only Vishnu. Agathiyar tells Narathar to watch one day for a potter. Narathar also does that and tells Agathiyar that the potter man chants about "Narayana" twice daily. Then, Agathiyar kept Narathar a small bowl full of oil in Narathar's hands. Agathiyar gives a rule asking Narathar to not spill one drop of oil while going around the world, and Narada does the job perfectly. Agathiyar then questions Narathar, "how many times did you chant "Narayana"'s name today?" for which Narathar answered saying "how can I even think of revering my name, when I have a burden kept in my hands?". Agathiyar explains to Narathar, that he has one smallest burden, but even while doing that you forgot to chant your name. But that man has much troubles in his family and many burdens. But he still remembered and chanted Vishnu's name, which makes him the best devotee of Vishnu.

Ravana was in a Yazh competition with Agathiyar Muni, because of taunting comments by the Narathar Muni. But who shall be the competition's referee? Ravana called Goddess Saraswati, but Saraswati told them, we both her eyes. So, she leaves them. Then only Ravan select for "Ponmalai" because stones only not melting to anything. both are composing the instrument Yazh who turn composing the Yazh when the mount started to melt, they won the competition. Unfortunately, Ravana loses the competition and then Agathiyar was given new name to "ponmalai", it named by Pothigai Malai (meaning it was give judgement for constant (or) the judgement is impartial).

It is said that two demon brothers Ilavala and Vathapi used to kill Brahmins as a revenge in a simple manner. The two had special powers, they came up with a plan to take revenge on Brahmins. "Vatapi" would turn in to ripe mango. He would invite any passers-by, especially Brahmins for a grand feast at his home. After they eat the mango, Ilavala would call his brother out: "Vathapi" , his brother would respond from the belly of the visitor and come out alive in one piece. In the process the guest would be killed. The two demons later would enjoy a curry made of human flesh. One day, Agathiyar happened to pass by, the plan as usual, Vatapi changed into a ripe mango and the other disguised himself as brahmachari (Sage of Bachelor) who invited Agathiyar to eat at the home. Agathiyar knew about the plan due to his immense Vedic Power, he resolves to teach both a lesson. After the meal, Agathiyar simply rubbed his stomach saying "Vathapi Jeerano bhave" may Vathapi be digested, while other demon tries to bring his brother life, but in vain. Agathiyar plainly informed the demon that his brother has been digested and could no longer be brought back to life, bringing their treachery to an end.

Cast 
Actors
 Sirkazhi Govindarajan as Agathiyar
 T. R. Mahalingam as Narathar
 A. V. M. Rajan as Lord Siva
 R. S. Manohar as Ravaneswaran/Langeswaran
T. K. Bhagavathy as Devendran
 Sasikumar as Jayandran (Devendran's son)
 Sivakumar as Poet Tholkappiayan
 Suruli Rajan
A. K. Veerasami as Saint
Usilai Mani as Boodham
O. A. K. Thevar as Vinthiyan (Vindhya mount)
 T. N. Sivathanu as Vadhaapi or Saththamuni
 Typist Gopu as Vilvala or Saagaramuni
E. R. Sahadevan
 K. D. Santhanam
Shanmugasundari
 Master Sekhar
 Master Sridhar
Gundu Karuppaiah
S. Ramarao

Actresses
 Kumari Padmini as Goddess Parvathy
 Lakshmi as Ponni/Kaviri
 C. R. Vijayakumari as Mandothari
 Manorama as Selli
A. Sakunthala as Urvasi
 M. Bhanumathi as Kakkai Padiniyar
 Rajakokila
 Baby Sridevi as Lord Murugan
 V. Vasantha
 P. Seethalakshmi
 Kalasree

Soundtrack 
Music was composed by Kunnakudi Vaidyanathan. lyrics were written by Ulundurpet Shanmugam, Poovai Senguttuvan, K. D. Santhanam, Era. Pazhanisamy, Puthaneri Subramanyam and Nellai Arulmani. The song "Isaiyai Tamizhai" is set in Kharaharapriya raga. The song "Vendriduven" is a ragamalika comprising 16 ragas and is composed in such a way that the name of the raga used in each stanza is a word play on a common Tamil word which sounds similar to the raga's name starting with Nattai, Bhairavi, Todi, Arabhi, Shanmukhapriya, Darbar, Hamsadhwani, Vasantha, Mohanam, Manolayam, Bageshri, Saranga, Kamboji, Gowrimanohari, Kalyani and Saraswathi,

References

External links 
 

1970s Tamil-language films
1972 films
Films about Hinduism
Films about royalty
Films directed by A. P. Nagarajan
Films scored by Kunnakudi Vaidyanathan
Films with screenplays by A. P. Nagarajan
Hindu devotional films
Hindu mythological films
Indian dance films
Indian epic films
Indian films based on actual events
Indian musical films
Religious epic films